Leptataspis acuta is a species of froghoppers belonging to the family Cercopidae.

Distribution
This species is present in Sumatra.

References 

 Schmidt E. (1910) Neue Gattungen und Arten der Subfamilie Cercopinae Stal, ein Beitrag zur Kenntnis der Cercopiden (Hemiptera-Homoptera)., Archiv für Naturgeschichte. Berlin, 76: 53-112.

Cercopidae
Fauna of Sumatra
Insects described in 1910